Sean Withy (born 1 February 2001) is a New Zealand rugby union player who plays for the  in Super Rugby and  in the National Provincial Championship (NPC). His playing position is flanker.

Early life
Withy attended Southland Boys' High School where he was the captain from 2017–2018. He was noted for his "work rate, accuracy and defensive work". In 2019 he moved to Dunedin to study at the University of Otago. He played club rugby for Otago University RFC.

Rugby career
In 2021 he captained the Highlanders U20 team at the inaugural Super Rugby Aotearoa U20 tournament. He was named player of the tournament. He was also a member of the New Zealand U20 team that undertook an internal domestic tour in June and July after a trans-Tasman tour was cancelled due to the COVID-19 pandemic.

Withy made his debut for Otago in the 2020 Mitre 10 Cup season, scoring one try that season in a match against Wellington.

In September 2021, he was signed by the Highlanders ahead of the 2022 Super Rugby season.

Reference list

External links
itsrugby.co.uk profile

New Zealand rugby union players
Living people
Rugby union flankers
Otago rugby union players
Rugby union players from Invercargill
2001 births
Highlanders (rugby union) players